Jameela Prakasam is the member of 13th Kerala Legislative Assembly. She is a member of J.D (S) party and represents Kovalam constituency.

Education

 B.Sc Zoology (Kerala University)

 MBA (IGNOU University)
 LLB (Kerala University)
 CAIIB (Indian Institute of Bankers)

Career
She entered politics as the vice chairperson of Kerala University Union in 1972. She worked as the Deputy General Manager at State Bank of Travancore, Thiruvananthapuram branch. In March 2011, she voluntarily retired from service to become a full-time politician and activist.

Personal life
She was born on 19 May 1957. She is the daughter of R. Prakasam and Lilly Prakasam. She is married to Dr. A Neelalohithadasan Nadar and has two daughters, Deepthi. N. Nadar and Divya. N. Nadar,

References 

1957 births
Living people
Place of birth missing (living people)
Members of the Kerala Legislative Assembly
Janata Dal (Secular) politicians